The Women's time trial of the 2022 UCI Road World Championships was a cycling event that took place on 18 September 2022 in Wollongong, Australia.

Final classification

References

Women's time trial
UCI Road World Championships – Women's time trial
2022 in women's road cycling